The 2019 Clare Senior Hurling Championship was the 124th staging of the Clare Senior Hurling Championship since its establishment by the Clare County Board in 1887.

The defending champions and holders of the Canon Hamilton Cup were Ballyea.

Senior Championship Fixtures

First round
 Eight winners advance to Round 2A (winners)
 Eight losers move to Round 2B (Losers)

Second round

A. Winners
 Played by eight winners of Round 1
 Four winners of this round advance to Quarter-finals
 Four losers move to Round 3

B. Losers
 Played by eight losers of Round 1
 Four winners of this round advance to Round 3
 Four losers of this round divert to Relegation Playoffs

Third round
 Played by four losers of Round 2A & four winners of Round 2B
 Four winners of this round advance to the Quarter-finals 
 Four losers divert to Senior B Championship

Quarter-finals
 Played by four winners of Round 2A and four winners of Round 3

Semi-finals

2019 County Final

Other Fixtures

Senior B Championship 
 Played by four losers of Round 3

Relegation Playoffs 
 Played by the four losers of Round 2B
 Win once to remain in Senior Championship for 2020
 Lose twice and relegated to Intermediate for 2020

References

External links

Clare Senior Hurling Championship
Clare Senior Hurling Championship